All Star Shore is an American reality competition streaming television series that premiered on Paramount+ on June 29, 2022. It is a successor to Jersey Shore that features television stars from around the world as they live together in a villa in Gran Canaria, Spain, to compete for $150,000.

Production 
The series was announced on February 15, 2022, when Paramount+ announced their new slate of shows. Shot in Spain during the COVID-19 pandemic between November and December 2021, the cast had to undergo a quarantine period before filming began.

Cast

Format
At the start of the season, cast members were instructed to take a pool float, paddle around a buoy and return to the beach. Unbeknownst to them, the number on the bottom of their float would determine their initial teammate. Each team begins with 10 "Paradise points" and attempt to earn more points during the season. The format is as follows:
Paradise Game: Teams compete in a "Paradise game" where the last-place team is automatically sent to the Exile game. The winning team earns a "Paradise reward" and the ability to select a second team to compete in the Exile game against the last-place team. Additionally, the first, second and third-place teams from the game receive 30, 20 and 10 Paradise points respectively.
Exile Game: The last-place team from the Paradise game compete in the Exile game against the team selected by the winners of the Paradise game. The losing pair lose all their points and must spend the night at an Exile location.

After the final "Shots and Found" Paradise game, the two teams with the most Paradise points automatically advanced to the Final Shore-Down. The remaining five teams had to compete in the "Haunted Vineyard" Exile game to determine the third team to compete in the Final Shore-Down.

 Twists
Partner Swap: At the episode 7 nominations, after the "Keg Stand" Paradise game but before the "What a Load of Crap" Exile game, cast members switched teams. Half of each teammate's former score at the time were combined to determine newly-formed team's Paradise point totals.
Paradise Rewards and Exiles: For the first nine episodes, the winners of Paradise games are rewarded with a special "Paradise reward" experience and selects a second team to join them. Meanwhile, the team that loses the Exile game are exiled from the villa and must spend the night at an Exile location.

Gameplay

Paradise games
Party Pong: Played tournament-style over four rounds. One team member must retrieve a net of balls floating in the water. They must then bounce the ball off a table to their partner who must catch them while standing in a giant cup, and must switch to a different cup after each catch. The first team to make three catches in each matchup advance to the next round. The team that wins the final round wins while the team that loses the first round the fastest is automatically sent to the Exile game.
Winners: Angelina & Joey
Poppin' Bottles One team member must climb up a slide to collect a champagne bottle and slide down again. They must then spray the champagne onto their partner's chest so the champagne flows down into a glass that they're holding against their body, and continue until they collect enough champagne to fill a container and reach a cork. Once they remove the cork, the first team to build a three-level pyramid using the empty champagne bottles wins.
Winners: Ricardo & Vanjie
Keg Stand: Teams dig under a fence to reach two beer kegs on the other side and pump the beer inside to fill a pitcher. They must then use the kegs to cross a section of the beach without touching the sand and pump the remaining beer into two beer glasses. The first team to finish wins while the last team to finish is automatically sent to the Exile game.
Winners: Blake & James
Host With the Most: Teams spin an oversized record player until the disc rises to a needle. They must then throw a disco ball around a spool until the attached string is fully wrapped around the spool. Once complete, teams then arrange a series of colored bottles so that no row or column can have the same colors. The first team to finish wins while the last team is automatically sent to the Exile game.
Winners: James & Marina
Shots and Found: One team member searches through pools of jello for five items commonly lost when drunk: keys, phone, sunglasses, wallet and watch. After finding each item, they must crawl under two beams and throw the item into a basket their partner is holding. The first team to find all five items and land them in their basket wins.
Winners: Karime & Ricardo

Exile games
Chummin' It Up: Team members begin on opposite sides of a wall. One team member grabs a fishing net full of chum and pushes it through a porthole their partner. Their partner must then search through the chum for a flare, place it in its holder and light it, repeating this process for all five nets of chum. Team members must switch positions after lighting each flare. The first team to light all five flares wins.
Played by: Chloe & Potro vs. Johnny & Trina
Dumpster Diving: Teams search through a dumpster and the surrounding garbage cans for four condoms with numbers inside the packaging, which form the combination to unlock teams' dumpsters. The first team to unlock their dumpsters, push them to the center of the Exile arena and close themselves inside wins.
Played by: Angelina & Joey vs. Bethan & Marina
What a Load of Crap: Teams must throw camel dung at three targets above their opponents. Each time team’s targets are hit, a trough of camel dung opens onto them. The first team to hit all three of their opponent's targets wins.
Played by: Chloe & Joey vs. Potro & Vanjie
Climb That Wood: Teams climb up a "mountain" of stairs covered in slippery sap to collect four pine cones at the top, one at a time. The first team to collect all four pine cones wins.
Played by: Angelina & Johnny vs. Giannina & Trina
Haunted Vineyard: Before the Exile game, all teams enter a building within the Viñedo de Oscura Sangre where they would learn the legend of Salvador Herman Tejino, the historic owner of the vineyard who murdered his victims and added their blood to red wine. Afterwards, teams must search the vineyard for five bags of puzzle pieces hidden at the five locations where Salvador buried his victims (chicken coop, church, kitchen, plantain farm and scenic overlook) and use the pieces to solve a puzzle revealing a map. They must then search for a key at the location depicted on the map and use it to unlock the vineyard gates and escape. Teams also receive a one-second head start for each Paradise point they possess. The first team to escape wins and advance to the Final Shore-Down.
Played by: Angelina & Johnny vs. Bethan & Blake vs. Giannina & Trina vs. Joey & Mike vs. Potro & Vanjie

Final Shore-Down
The two teams with the highest points at the end of the "Shots and Found" Paradise game, and the winning team from the "Haunted Vineyard" Exile game competed in the Final Shore-Down.
Shore Is Lava:  Teams must take two cups from one side of the Arena to the other, crossing an obstacle course made of items used during previous Paradise and Exile games. After crossing the course, both team members must successfully flip the cup on a table, before repeating this process for all three obstacle courses. Teams must return to the start of each course if they fall off or drop their cups. The first team to cross all three courses and successfully flip all six cups are declared the winners of the Final Shore-Down.
Winners: James & Marina

Final Twist
After winning the Final Shore-Down, it was revealed that James & Marina had to compete against each other in the "Final Twist" challenge to determine who would win the $150,000 grand prize.
The Golden Cup: Each round, players are randomly assigned either an empty box or a box containing a golden cup. One player may look inside their box to see which one they have. Based on the contents inside, they must then try to convince their opponent to either keep or swap boxes. Afterwards, their opponent can choose to keep their box or swap boxes. The player who ends up with the golden cup at the end of each round wins the round. The first player to win two rounds wins the $150,000 grand prize.
Winner: Marina

Game summary

Point progress

 Paradise points at the end of each cycle
Competition key

 The contestant's team won the Final Shore-Down
 The contestant's team lost the Final Shore-Down
 The contestant's team lost the final Exile game and did not advance to the Final Shore-Down
 The contestant's team won the Paradise game and earned 30 points 
 The contestant's team was not selected for the Exile game
 The contestant's team won the game in Exile
 The contestant's team lost the Exile game and lost all of their points
 The contestant withdrew from the competition

Partner progress

Paradise rewards and Exiles
For the first nine episodes, the winners of each Paradise game are given a special Paradise reward experience and selects a second team to join them. The team that loses the Exile game are exiled from the villa and must spend the night at an Exile location.

Episodes

Notes

References 

2020s American reality television series
2022 American television series debuts
English-language television shows
American television spin-offs
Jersey Shore (TV series)
Paramount+ original programming
Reality competition television series
Reality television spin-offs
Television shows filmed in Spain
Television shows set in the Canary Islands
Television series by ITV Studios